Randi Anda (née Friestad; 29 December 1898, Egersund – 7 May 1999) was a Norwegian politician for the Christian Democratic Party.

She served as a deputy representative to the Parliament of Norway from Rogaland during the terms 1954–57, 1958–61, 1961–65 and 1965–69. Outside politics she was known for being a missionary to China.

During the Second World War, she and her husband Arne worked in Qiqihar, Manchukuo before they were taken prisoner by the Japanese on 8 December 1941. They were incarcerated in Qiqihar's concentration camp for three and a half years until the war's end.

References

1898 births
1999 deaths
Deputy members of the Storting
Christian Democratic Party (Norway) politicians
Rogaland politicians
Women members of the Storting
Norwegian centenarians
Norwegian Protestant missionaries
Female Christian missionaries
Protestant missionaries in China
World War II civilian prisoners held by Japan
Norwegian prisoners of war in World War II
20th-century Norwegian women politicians
20th-century Norwegian politicians
Place of death missing
Women centenarians